OFK Sinđelić Niš is a football club based in Niš, Serbia. They compete in the Zone League Centre, the fourth tier of the national league system.

History
Founded in 1918, the club initially competed in a local league organized by the Niš Football Subassociation, winning the title in the competition's inaugural 1932 season.

After the breakup of Yugoslavia, the club won the newly formed Serbian League Niš in the 1995–96 season and took promotion to the Second League of FR Yugoslavia. They placed second from the bottom in Group East in their debut appearance and were instantly relegated from the second tier. Between 1997 and 2004, the club played seven seasons in the third tier, including six in the Serbian League Niš and one in the Serbian League East. They subsequently won the Niš Zone League in 2004–05, thus returned to the third tier.

The club achieved one of its biggest results in history by reaching the quarter-finals of the 2007–08 Serbian Cup, but eventually lost 5–1 to Partizan. After finishing as runners-up in the 2007–08 Serbian League East, they finished as champions in the 2009–10 season and earned promotion to the Serbian First League. The club placed fifth in its debut appearance in the second tier of Serbian football. They also repeated their best result in the national cup by reaching the quarter-finals of the 2010–11 Serbian Cup, when they were again eliminated by Partizan after losing 4–0. The club was relegated from the First League in the 2011–12 season.

Between 2012 and 2021, the club played in the Serbian League East for eight seasons. They marked their 100th anniversary in October 2018.

Honours
Serbian League Niš / Serbian League East (Tier 3)
 1995–96 / 2009–10
Niš Zone League (Tier 4)
 2004–05

Notable players
This is a list of players who have played at full international level.
  Aleksandar Pantić
For a list of all FK Sinđelić Niš players with a Wikipedia article, see :Category:FK Sinđelić Niš players.

Managerial history

References

External links
 Club page at Srbijasport

1918 establishments in Serbia
Association football clubs established in 1918
Football clubs in Serbia
Sport in Niš